2001 Júbilo Iwata season

Competitions

Domestic results

J.League 1

First stage

Second stage

Suntory Championship

Emperor's Cup
Júbilo Iwata was granted a Bye on the first and second rounds.

J.League Cup

International results

Asian Club Championship
Júbilo Iwata qualified for this tournament as winners of the 1999 season.
Second Round

Quarter-finals

Final Four

FIFA Club World Championship
As winners of the 1999 Asian Super Cup, Júbilo Iwata was one of the 12 teams that were invited to the 2001 FIFA Club World Championship, which would be hosted in Spain from 28 July to 12 August 2001. However, the tournament was cancelled, primarily due to the collapse of ISL, which was marketing partner of FIFA at the time.

Player statistics

Other pages
 J.League official site

Jubilo Iwata
Júbilo Iwata seasons